The Scottish Rugby Academy provides Scotland's up and coming rugby stars a dedicated focused routeway for development into the professional game. Entry is restricted to Scottish qualified students and both male and female entrants are accepted into 4 regional academies. The 2015–16 season sees the first year of the academy.

Season overview

This was the founding year of the Scottish Rugby Academy.

Regional Academies

The Scottish Rugby Academy runs four regional academies in Scotland:- Glasgow and the West, Borders and East Lothian, Edinburgh and Caledonia. These roughly correspond to the traditional districts of Glasgow District, South, Edinburgh District and North and Midlands.

Players and Stages

Players are selected in three stages:- Stage 1 - Regionally selected and regionally supported players; Stage 2 - Nationally selected and regionally supported players; and Stage 3 - Nationally selected and regionally supported players.

Stage 3 players

Stage 3 players are assigned to a professional team. Nominally, for the men, Glasgow Warriors receive the Stage 3 players of Glasgow and the West and Caledonia regions, while Edinburgh Rugby receive the Stage 3 players of the Edinburgh and Borders and East Lothian regions. The women are integrated into the Scotland women's national rugby sevens team and the Scotland women's national rugby union team.

Borders and East Lothian

Caledonia

Edinburgh

Glasgow and the West

Stage 1 and Stage 2 players

The inductees into the 2015–16 season are split into their regional academies.

Borders and East Lothian

 Stephen Ainslie Stage 2 Currie RFC (Number Eight)
 Harry Borthwick Stage 2 Melrose RFC (Locks)
 Darcy Graham Stage 2 Hawick RFC (Full-back)
 Andrew Grant-Suttie Stage 2 North Berwick RFC (Openside flanker)
 Finn Hobbis Stage 2 North Berwick RFC (Prop)
 Andrew Horne Stage 2 Preston Lodge RFC (Blindside flanker)
 Grant Huggan Stage 2 Hawick RFC) (Stand-off
 Craig Pringle Stage 2 Melrose RFC (Centre)
 Fraser Renwick Stage 2 Hawick RFC (Hooker)
 Chloe Rollie Stage 2 Melrose Ladies RFC (Full-back)
 Daniel Suddon Stage 2 Hawick RFC (Locks)
 Lisa Thomson Stage 2 Melrose Ladies RFC (Centre)

Caledonia

 Kaleem Barreto Stage 2 Glenalmond College (Scrum-half)
 Callum Cruickshank Stage 2 Dollar Academy (Number Eight)
 Matt Emmison Stage 2 Aberdeenshire RFC (Hooker)
 Ben Enyon Stage 2 Strathallan School (Wing)
 Matt Fagerson Stage 2 Strathallan School (Blindside flanker)
 Ewan Fox Stage 2 High School of Dundee (Scrum-half)
 George Goodenough Stage 2 Ellon RFC (Stand-off)
 Caitlan Harvey Stage 2 Caithness RFC (Wing)
 Josh Henderson Stage 2 Glasgow Hawks RFC (Stand-off)
 Megan Kennedy Stage 2 Stirling County RFC (Prop)
 Duncan Leese Stage 2 Dundee HSFP (Centre)
 Lewis McLean Stage 2 Strathallan School (Prop)
 Mark New Stage 2 Strathallan School (Centre)
 Adam Nicol Stage 2 Dunfermline RFC (Prop)
 Lucy Park Stage 2 Murrayfield Wanderers RFC (Openside flanker)
 Bruce Sorbie Stage 2 Aberdeenshire RFC (Full-back)
 Emma Wassell Stage 2 Murrayfield Wanderers RFC (Locks)

Edinburgh

 Ben Appleson Stage 2 The Edinburgh Academy (Full-back)
 Hamish Bain Stage 2 Currie RFC (Locks)
 Luke Crosbie Stage 2 Currie RFC (Blindside flanker)
 Katie Dougan Stage 2 RHC Cougars RFC (Prop)
 Ross Dunbar Stage 2 Stirling County RFC (Prop)
 Fin Field Stage 2 Edinburgh University RFC (Locks)
 Thomas Gordon Stage 2 Currie RFC (Openside flanker)
 Ali Greig Stage 2 Stewart's Melville RFC (Wing)
 Mhairi Grieve Stage 2 RHC Cougars RFC (Scrum-half)
 Fergus Haig Stage 2 Fettes College (Openside flanker)
 Sarah Law Stage 2 Murrayfield Wanderers RFC (Scrum-half)
 Lisa Martin Stage 2 Murrayfield Wanderers RFC (Stand-off)
 Ross McCann Stage 2 Royal High School (Wing)
 Lisa Robertson Stage 2 Murrayfield Wanderers RFC (Prop)
 Charlie Shiel Stage 2 Currie RFC (Scrum-half)
 Eilidh Sinclair Stage 2 Murrayfield Wanderers RFC (Wing)
 Aaron Tait Stage 2 Merchiston Castle School (Scrum-half)

Glasgow and the West

 Paul Cairncross Stage 2 East Kilbride RFC (Hooker)
 Rachael Cook Stage 2 Murrayfield Wanderers RFC (Blindside flanker)
 Calum Gaw Stage 2 Ayr RFC (Centre)
 Martin Hughes Stage 2 St. Aloysius College RFC (Blindside flanker)
 Jade Konkel Stage 2 Hillhead Jordanhill RFC (Number Eight)
 Charlie Lonergan Stage 2 GHA RFC (Centre)
 Louise McMillan Stage 2 Hillhead Jordanhill RFC (Blindside flanker)
 Gregor Paxton Stage 2 Ayr RFC (Centre)
 Paul Ramsey Stage 2 Glasgow Hawks RFC (Wing)
 Archie Russell Stage 2 Ayr RFC (Centre)
 Andrew Simpson Stage 2 Currie RFC (Number Eight)
 Lana Skeldon Stage 2 Hillhead Jordanhill RFC (Hooker)
 Robbie Smith Stage 2 Newton Stewart RFC (Hooker)

Graduates of this year 

Players who have signed professional contracts with clubs:

 Andrew Davidson to  Newcastle Falcons
 Lewis Carmichael to Edinburgh Rugby
 Jack Cosgrove to Edinburgh Rugby
 Ross Graham to  Yorkshire Carnegie
 Robbie Fergusson to  London Scottish F.C.
 Scott Cummings to Glasgow Warriors
 Ali Price to Glasgow Warriors
 James Malcolm to Glasgow Warriors
 Nick Grigg to Glasgow Warriors

References

2015-16
2015–16 in Scottish rugby union